Bill Gibbons, Jr. is a former American women's basketball coach. As head coach for College of the Holy Cross in Worcester, Massachusetts, Gibbons was one of the longest tenured coaches in the NCAA Division 1, having debuted as coach during the 1985-1986 season and coaching at Holy Cross until 2019. In 2007, Gibbons was an assistant coach on the United States squad that won the gold medal in women's basketball at the Pan American Games.

In October 2014, Gibbons was removed as head basketball coach after a former player, Ashley Cooper, filed a lawsuit against him alleging physical and verbal abuse. He was reinstated to the team in January 2015 after Holy Cross investigated and concluded that "The College believes the lawsuit's allegations have no legal merit" and were false;.

On March 28, 2019, Gibbon’s contract was not renewed after a second suspension as head coach.

He was born and raised in Worcester and graduated from Clark University with his B.A. and M.A.

Coaching career

Sources:

 NCAA
 Patriot League record book
 Holy Cross Year-By-Year Records 
 Patriot League 2017-18 Women's Basketball Standings
 Patriot League 2016-17 Women's Basketball Standings
 2015-16 Patriot League WBB

References

Year of birth missing (living people)
Living people
Clark University alumni
Sportspeople from Worcester, Massachusetts
Holy Cross Crusaders women's basketball coaches
American women's basketball coaches
Basketball coaches from Massachusetts